Route 243 is a north/south highway on the south shore of the Saint Lawrence River. Its northern terminus is in Saint-Félix-de-Kingsey at the junction of Route 255 and its southern terminus is in the township of Potton where it crosses the Canada–US border at the North Troy–Highwater Border Crossing into Vermont and becomes Vermont Route 243. Route 243 is not a busy highway as it does not go through big towns.

The highway has three concurrencies:
 In Richmond, it shares a bridge across the Saint-François River with Route 116 and  Route 143
 At Racine a 2 km concurrence with  Route 222 occurs.
 In Waterloo it runs concurrently first with Route 112, then both it and Route 241 as all three share a bridge across the North Yamaska River

Municipalities along Route 243

 Saint-Félix-de-Kingsey
  Richmond
 Melbourne
 Racine
 Lawrenceville
 Sainte-Anne-de-la-Rochelle
 Warden
 Waterloo
 Brome Lake
 Bolton-Sud
 West Bolton
 Potton

See also
 List of Quebec provincial highways

References

External links 
 Provincial Route Map (Courtesy of the Quebec Ministry of Transportation) 
 Route 243 on Google Maps

243